, styled as I⊃：INVΛ⊃≡⊃, is a Japanese anime television series produced by NAZ, directed by Ei Aoki and written by Ōtarō Maijō. It was broadcast from January to March 2020. A manga sequel by Yūki Kodama was serialized in Kadokawa Shoten's seinen manga magazine Young Ace from October 2019 to November 2020.

Synopsis 
The story follows the investigations of Narihisago, a renowned detective now in prison, who is tasked with diving into the id wells of various serial killers. Two years prior to the current events, Narihisago's daughter Muku was brutally murdered by a serial killer, leading Narihisago's wife to commit suicide. These deaths prompted him to hunt down and murder the killer, earning him his prison sentence. He is still depressed and haunted by his wife and daughter's deaths, but also uses this as motivation to take his work seriously and help stop serial killers; however, as a result of the deaths of his family, he bears a grudge against all serial killers, which occasionally manifests as an uncontrollable urge to kill. Despite this however, it is shown that the majority of Narihisago's colleagues have great respect for his work. 
Rookie field analyst Hondomachi becomes an important character during the series after having a brush with death in a serial killer case.

Events take place in a world where investigators have the power to tap into a killer's unconscious and see fragmented parts of their psyche. This is referred to as an "id well", a mental plane that can be digitally entered to collect clues regarding a killer's victims, crime scenes, and motives. As one traverses through an id well, their sights and actions appear as digital projections in the real world for investigators to analyze in real-time. Since a person's unconscious thoughts are rarely organized, everything within an id, including people and locations will appear in a fractured or symbolic state and can only be temporarily put together by someone investigating the id well. Additionally, id wells can only be entered by victims or other killers. While it is possible to get hurt or die in an id well, the Well traveler can simply be removed and re-injected into the Well again, though all previous memories from their time in there will be lost.

Field analysts assist Well investigators using a tool called "Wakumusubi ", a sort of handheld radar gun that detects and collects delicate "cognition particles", given off by a person's intent to kill. The scanner can be programmed to collect the killing intent of a specific criminal and add that information to their id well. This helps flesh out the killer's Well for a more thorough investigation. Additionally, the memories of victims encountered in id wells can also add important information to the environment.

Characters 
 

A renowned detective assisting in investigating and analyzing serial killer id wells. His real name is Akihito Narihisago, but during his time in id wells he is referred to as the brilliant detective . In the past he was once a happy family man with a daughter named Muku. Two years prior to the current events Muku was murdered by a serial killer nicknamed the Challenger, followed by Narihisago's wife committing suicide out of grief, leading Narihisago to kill the Challenger out of revenge. He is sentenced to prison for this, and is placed in the maximum security section with other killers. Feeling guilty for not being able to protect Muku, her death continues to haunt Narihisago and gives him nightmares. However having killed someone, he is now able to enter id wells and retrieve information in serial killer cases. He is shown to have to bear a grudge against all serial killers and on occasion uses the knowledge gleaned from their id wells to cause them to commit suicide in prison, something that creates friction between him and the rest of the investigation team. 

Head inspector of the investigation unit, and a good friend of Narihisago. He worked with Narihisago as a police officer prior to Narihisago's imprisonment. While he has strong trust in Sakaido's detective skills, he worries for Narihisago's mental health. He rescued the last victim in the Challenger case, Kiki Atsukai, but is puzzled by her disappearance and has secretly tried to investigate her vanishing.

A notorious serial killer also known as the "Perforator" for his gruesome style of murdering victims using a drill. Fukuda has arithmomania, and drilled a hole in his head to try to block out his thoughts prior to becoming a serial killer. He is also scarred on the right side of his face. It is stated that parts of his brain were impacted by the drill procedure, affecting some of his cognitive functions. He is shown to be a very calculating psychopath with a high IQ, and enjoys taunting Narihisago. He is also briefly considered as Sakaido's substitute for id well investigations, whereupon he is named . While ultimately not chosen as a replacement, Anaido and Sakaido do work together as Well detectives in the eighth episode of the series. Unlike other serial killers, Fukuda is the only killer who did not murder Kiki Asukai prior to becoming a serial killer.

A 23-year-old rookie field analyst working under Matsuoka at the beginning of the series. She almost becomes a victim of the Perforator after he kidnaps her, but uses this to her team's advantage. She purposely attempts to commit suicide via the Perforator's drill, generating an id well that ultimately leads to his capture. Hondomachi recovers from the incident, but is left with a hole in her head. Upon killing someone in self-defense during the Gravedigger case, she is recommended by Matsuoka to become an id well investigator. During her time in id wells, she is known as Detective . Hondomachi and Fukuda's relationship becomes one of mutual respect over the course of the series, despite Fukuda's former attempt to kill her.
 

A mysterious dead girl whose body appears at the start of every id well investigation. The method of her murder varies depending on the id well of the serial killer being investigated, but it helps Sakaido discover clues about the real killer's murder methods or motives. Oftentimes Kaeru's body is a placeholder for a serial killer's victims in the event that the killer does not remember details of what their victim looks like. Later in the series, Kaeru is revealed to be , the last victim from the Challenger case, who disappeared after she was rescued. Asukai is a telepath who can inadvertently project her thoughts, memories and dreams into the minds of other people and occasionally be premonitory with her dreams. Because of her power, she had intense dreams of being brutally murdered every night by different serial killers, starting with John Walker, who invited other serial killers into her dreams. As her power began to grow out of control and draw people around her into comas, she was kidnapped by John Walker to empower the Mizuhanome system. Kiki's id well is accessible from the id wells of those who used to interact with her, in form of a cockpit chair.
 
The main antagonist. A mysterious, distorted man who has appeared in the id wells of multiple serial killers, but never speaks. He wears a red frock coat, a gold top hat, brown boots, and a black bow tie. Togo deduces he somehow fuels the serial killer's desire to kill, and Chief Hayaseura deduces he may be a serial killer creator encouraging others to murder. His appearances in unconsciouses have fueled at least five people to become serial killers, leading to at least 44 murders. In the Well world, he appears as the arrogant detective , but is also able to enter id wells without this persona, aware of his own identity. He is depicted as having a God complex and feels no regret for creating serial killers, brushing it off as a minor issue in his overarching plan.

Kura Department 

An elderly man who is the head chief of the investigation unit, and helped create the Kura Well system.

The inventor of Mizuhanome System. During Narihisago's time in Kiki's id well, it is shown that Nishio was a doctor and independent researcher at Kiki's hospital, and used her as a test subject to study how to enter one's unconscious via dreams. Nishio and John Walker kidnapped Kiki to create the Kura Well and Mizuhanome systems. 

Assistant director and general analyst to Momoki, leading the investigation team when he is unavailable. She is implied to have a romantic relationship with Momoki.

A member of Inspector Momoki's team who digitally analyzes the locations within the id wells. He is shown to have somewhat of a skeptic personality.

A member of Inspector Momoki's team who analyzes people appearing in id wells. He shows slight disdain for having to work with a criminal like Narihisago.

An important member of Inspector Momoki's team who makes deductions about scenes and events as they are being investigated in the id well. 

An assistant to Inspector Momoki who primarily helps Togo with analysis. At the end of the series, he is given the position of Acting Chief Director.

Head of the Kura department assisting police at crime scenes under investigation. He is murdered during the Gravedigger case when he enters a rigged crime scene with his team.

The by-the-book head field analyst for the investigation team, and the higher-up partner of Hondomachi. He worked with Narihisago in the past when they were both detectives, but was never very fond of him. Following Hondomachi's actions during the Gravedigger case, Matsuoka recommends her for the Wellside department to become an id well investigator. However, he privately discloses to Hondomachi that he only did so because he realized Hondomachi might have a penchant for dangerous situations, which he does not consider normal.

Others

Narihisago's teen daughter, brutally murdered by the Challenger serial killer prior to the start of the series. The gruesomeness of her murder drove her mother to commit suicide and fueled Narihisago to murder the Challenger and earn his prison sentence.

Narihisago's deceased wife and the mother of Muku. A gentle and kind woman, she was unable to handle the shock and grief from Muku's murder. She commits suicide prior to the start of the series by slitting her wrists in the bathtub.

A serial killer known as the "Challenger", responsible for the murder of Narihisago's daughter Muku. He was an extremely strong and wealthy man. He brutally murdered his victims by forcing them into hardcore wrestling matches, originally choosing strong opponents, but quickly getting a thrill from murdering weak and helpless ones. Kiki believes the Challenger was both a sadist and a masochist, as he enjoyed both hurting people as well as being hit back. He mainly murdered his victims in a wrestling arena built in his basement, but occasionally committed his murders outside of his home, as in the case of Muku. His last attempted victim was Kiki Asukai, who was rescued by Momoki. Prior to the start of the series, Narihisago guns down the Challenger after Muku is murdered, leading to Narihisago's prison sentence.

A cold-hearted serial killer known as the "Gravedigger" for her style of burying victims alive and live-streaming their deaths for her sadistic viewing pleasure. Though she personally did not kill anyone, she perpetrates the Gravedigger murders by having her childhood crush and former Perforator victim Haruka Kazuta carry out the murders on her behalf. When Inami was 14, her mother committed suicide by jumping in front of a train with Inami on board. This incident warped Inami's psyche and made her become fascinated with death. She thinks Hondomachi is cute, but is also wildly jealous of her for sharing a kiss with Kazuta. Inami is arrested and taken into custody by Hondomachi and Matsuoka after a failed ambush to kill them. Near the end of the series, she is murdered in an id Well by John Walker.

Media

Anime
On July 4, 2019, Kadokawa announced a new original anime television series directed by Ei Aoki and written by novelist Ōtarō Maijō. Atsushi Ikariya is designing the characters, while Atsushi Umebori and Slavek Kowalewski are composing the series' music under the artist collective U/S. NAZ is animating the series. The series premiered from January 5 to March 22, 2020 on Tokyo MX, BS11, TVA, KBS, and SUN, with the first episode listed as a one-hour special. Sou performed the show opening theme song  and Miyavi performed the series' ending theme song "Other Side". His songs "UP", "Samurai 45", and "Butterfly" were also included in the first, fourth, twelfth, and thirteenth episodes, respectively (with "UP" being used again as the ending credit in episode thirteen). The anime also contains several insert songs throughout the series, including "Eternal Rail" from Kenmochi Hidefumi of Wednesday Campanella in the sixth episode, a song from Kazuya Nagami in the ninth episode, and the song "Memories of Love" composed by Hiroshi Suenami & Soundbreakers and sang by Liz Sarria II in the tenth episode.

The first two episodes were given special preview screenings on December 15, 2019 on Funimation, Hulu, and Wakanim, and on December 16, 2019 on AnimeLab due to time differences. Funimation has licensed the series for a simuldub. It ran for 13 episodes.

Episode list

Manga
A manga sequel by Yūki Kodama, titled ID:Invaded #Brake Broken, was serialized in Kadokawa's Young Ace magazine from October 4, 2019 to November 4, 2020 and collected into three volumes. Yen Press licensed the manga for a North American release.

Volume list

See also
 Blood Lad, another manga series by the same illustrator as the manga sequel
 Hamatora, another manga series with the art by the same illustrator as the manga sequel
 Psycho-Pass, another anime series with a similar premise

Notes

References

External links
  
 

2020 anime television series debuts
Anime with original screenplays
Funimation
Kadokawa Shoten manga
Mystery anime and manga
Naz (studio)
Science fiction anime and manga
Seinen manga
Tokyo MX original programming
Yen Press titles